Harnath Bain is a Awami League politician and the former Member of Parliament of Bakerganj-12.

Career
Bain was elected to parliament from Bakerganj-12 as an Awami League candidate in 1973.

Bain contested the 1991 parliamentary election from Khulna-2 as an Awami League candidate and lost the election to the Workers Party of Bangladesh candidate, Rashed Khan Menon.

References

Awami League politicians
Living people
1st Jatiya Sangsad members
Year of birth missing (living people)